The Governor of Romblon is the local chief executive of the Philippine province of Romblon.

Genealogy
Some governors, representatives and board members of Romblon, just like everybody in the province, are related. Jose Firmalo y Fetalino, for example, was the uncle of Eduardo Firmalo y Chang and Perpetuo Ylagan's wife Divina Fondevilla y Grimares was the niece of Patriotismo Fondevilla y Fainsan. The current vice-governor Felix Ylagan is the son of Perpetuo Ylagan by Divina Fondevilla and therefore, grandnephew of the late governor Patriotismo Fondevilla.

References

Governors of Romblon
Politics of Romblon
Governors of provinces of the Philippines